The 1997 Big League World Series took place from August 8–16 in Broward County, Florida, United States. Host Broward County, Florida defeated Maracaibo, Venezuela in the championship game.

Teams

Results

United States Bracket

International Bracket

Elimination round

References

Big League World Series
Big League World Series